Steven James Lerud (born October 13, 1984) is an American former professional baseball catcher, who is currently a manager in the Chicago Cubs organization. During his playing days, he briefly played in Major League Baseball (MLB) for the Philadelphia Phillies (–).

Early life
Steven Lerud was born in Reno, Nevada. Lerud attended to Galena High School, in Reno, Nevada.

Career

Pittsburgh Pirates
Lerud was drafted by the Pittsburgh Pirates in the third round of the 2003 MLB Draft. On November 9, 2009, he elected free agency.

Kansas City Royals
On December 7, 2009, he signed a minor league deal with the Kansas City Royals.

Baltimore Orioles
Lerud was acquired by the Baltimore Orioles on March 27, 2010. He elected free agency on November 6, 2010 and re-signed on a minor league deal on December 26, 2010. Lerud elected free agency again on November 2, 2011.

Philadelphia Phillies
On December 9, 2011, Lerud signed a minor league deal with the Phillies, who promoted him to the big leagues on August 24, 2012. He appeared in 3 MLB games in 2012, batting .200, in 10 at-bats. Lerud was subsequently dropped from the 40-man roster after the end of that season, but signed a 2013 minor league contract with the Phillies' organization. He appeared in 6 major league games with the Phillies in 2013, going hitless in 5 at-bats. Lerud elected free agency on October 1, 2013.

Atlanta Braves
He signed a minor league deal with the Atlanta Braves on November 11, 2013 and received a non-roster invitation to Major League spring training.

Washington Nationals
On January 12, 2015 Lerud signed a minor league deal with the Washington Nationals he was assigned to AAA Syracuse Chiefs the same day. He elected free agency on November 7, 2015.

Seattle Mariners
On February 3, 2016, Lerud signed a minor league deal with the Seattle Mariners and received an invite to spring training. He was released by the Mariners on April 7.

San Francisco Giants
On April 27, 2016, Lerud signed a minor league deal with the San Francisco Giants. He elected free agency on November 7, 2016.

Texas Rangers
On January 5, 2017, Lerud signed a minor league deal with the Texas Rangers with an invite to spring training. He elected free agency on November 6, 2017.

Coaching career
On January 19, 2018, Lerud was named as manager of the Minor League Baseball (MiLB) Class A Short Season Eugene Emeralds, a Northwest League affiliate of the Cubs.
In 2019, Lerud was named as manager for the Myrtle Beach Pelicans, Class A Advanced affiliate for the Chicago Cubs.

References

External links

Steve Lerud at Baseball Gauge

1984 births
Living people
Major League Baseball catchers
Baseball players from Nevada
Eugene Emeralds managers
Philadelphia Phillies players
Gulf Coast Pirates players
Williamsport Crosscutters players
Hickory Crawdads players
Lynchburg Hillcats players
Altoona Curve players
Norfolk Tides players
Bowie Baysox players
Reading Phillies players
Lehigh Valley IronPigs players
Gwinnett Braves players
Honolulu Sharks players
Scottsdale Scorpions players
Toros del Este players
American expatriate baseball players in the Dominican Republic
Syracuse Chiefs players
Richmond Flying Squirrels players